Søren Andersen (born March 23, 1948) is a former Danish handball player who competed in the 1976 Summer Olympics.

He played his club handball with Fredericia KFUM. In 1976 he was part of the Denmark men's national handball team which finished eighth in the Olympic tournament. He played four matches and scored eleven goals.

External links
Sports-Reference profile

1948 births
Living people
Danish male handball players
Olympic handball players of Denmark
Handball players at the 1976 Summer Olympics